Prévenchères is a commune in the Lozère department in southern France.

Geography
The village lies on the left bank of the Chassezac, which flows southeastward through the western part of the commune.

See also
Communes of the Lozère department

References

Communes of Lozère
Plus Beaux Villages de France